Pershyi (meaning First) is the Ukrainian public television channel, operated by the Public Broadcasting Company of Ukraine.

It is the only Ukrainian TV channel covering over 97% of Ukraine's territory. Its programs are oriented toward all levels of Ukrainian society and national minorities. Among priority directions of the network are information, popular science, culture, entertainment and sports.

History

It was launched in 2015 as the main TV channel of the newly created public broadcaster. The channel has replaced Pershyi Natsionalnyi (First National), the state-operated TV channel that traced its origin to the Soviet UT (Ukrainian Television) and after dissolution of the Soviet Union UT-1.

UA꞉ Pershyi is not influenced by the state nor by Ukrainian oligarchs, which makes it one of the most transparent and reliable media in Ukraine. The channel has a series of journalistic investigations related to corruption in Ukrainian politics, including incidents that were related to the incumbent (at the time) presidents Petro Poroshenko and Volodymyr Zelensky.

In 2019, it was announced that the channel will change its name to Suspilne TV (Public Television) as a part of rebranding process of the public broadcaster. However, this idea was later dismissed by the Supervisory Board of Suspilne, who decided to keep the name Pershyi after the rebranding. The channel changed its logo and visual identity to the current on May 23, 2022.

Logos
Between 1991 and 1995, the logo was in the bottom-right corner and then (1995–1997) the logo was in the top left corner. From 1997–2022, it was in the top right corner. The logo returned to top left corner starting from 2022.
 Between March 6, 1992 and August 23, 1997, the logo was a large-type УТ-1 and was white and semitransparent. It was on bottom right corner (until 1995) and later switched to the top left corner. It disappeared during news and advertisements in 1991–92 and 1995–96 respectively.
 Between August 24, 1997 and February 6, 1998, the logo was a red-green-blue triangle that remotely resembled a diagonal one. It was on top right corner.
 Between February 7, 1998 and August 23, 2005, the logo was white and transparent vertical line and was white and semitransparent. Its on-screen display position remained unchanged.
 Between August 24, 2005 and March 31, 2006, the logo was white, was included in a ring with white boundary paths and red background. Its on-screen display position remained unchanged.
 Between April 1, 2006 and August 31, 2008, the logo was white, was included in a ring with white boundary paths and a transparent background. The logo was white and non-transparent. Its on-screen display position remained unchanged.
 From September 1, 2008 and June 6, 2014, the logo is white and transparent and was the Ukrainian word ПЕРШИЙ, meaning first. Its on-screen display position remained unchanged.
From June 7, 2014 and April 6, 2015, the logo is white and transparent and was the Ukrainian word ПЕРШИЙ and miniature of Ukrainian flag. Its on-screen display position remained unchanged.
 From April 7, 2015 and May 21, 2022, the logo is white and was a large-type UA꞉ПЕРШИЙ (with the colon in colours of the Ukrainian flag until April 2016). Its on-screen display position remains unchanged. Since broadcasting into 16:9 format, the logo become smaller and letters are translucent. The ꞉ is not translucent.

See also
Eastern Bloc information dissemination

Notes

References

External links 

 Official Site

Ukrainian-language television stations in Ukraine
Eastern Bloc mass media
Television stations in Ukraine
Ukrainian brands
Television channels and stations established in 1956
1951 establishments in Ukraine
1956 establishments in Ukraine
 
Publicly funded broadcasters